The Honduran Patriotic Alliance is a centre-right political party in Honduras. Romeo Vásquez Velásquez was the party's candidate in the 2013 Honduran general election.

References

2012 establishments in Honduras
Political parties established in 2012
Political parties in Honduras
National conservative parties
Conservatism in Honduras